Elsmore is a city in Allen County, Kansas, United States.  As of the 2020 census, the population of the city was 50.  The name Elsmore is a corruption of Elsinore, where Shakespeare's play Hamlet was set.

History
The old town of Elsmore, which for several years was the center of attraction for the citizens of Elsmore Township, was located farther west, not far from Big Creek.  On August 25, 1888, after the route of the Missouri, Kansas & Texas R.R. from Kansas City to Parsons had been definitely settled, N.L. Ard, J.L. Roberts, J.A. Nicholson, W.D. and H.W. Cox, and O.P. Mattson purchased  where the present town of Elsmore stands, and platted the town.  It soon became a popular trading center and shipping point for that section of the county, and in 1909 was incorporated.  In 1910 it reported a population of 216 and had a money order post office (first opened in November 1866) with two rural delivery routes, a bank, several good stores, some small manufacturing enterprises, telegraph and express facilities.

Geography
Elsmore is located at  (37.794222, -95.149458), in Section 7, Township 26 south, Range 21 east. U.S. Route 59 passes west of the city, and K-203 is a short connector (less than a mile) between US-59 and the city.

Demographics

2010 census
As of the census of 2010, there were 77 people, 35 households, and 22 families residing in the city. The racial makeup of the city was 100.0% White.

There were 35 households, of which 25.7% had children under the age of 18 living with them, 45.7% were married couples living together, 8.6% had a female householder with no husband present, 8.6% had a male householder with no wife present, and 37.1% were non-families. 34.3% of all households were made up of individuals, and 22.8% had someone living alone who was 65 years of age or older. The average household size was 2.20 and the average family size was 2.68.

The median age in the city was 47.8 years. 22.1% of residents were under the age of 18; 5.2% were between the ages of 18 and 24; 19.5% were from 25 to 44; 23.4% were from 45 to 64; and 29.9% were 65 years of age or older. The gender makeup of the city was 48.1% male and 51.9% female.

2000 census
As of the U.S. Census in 2000, there were 73 people, 35 households, and 21 families residing in the city. The racial makeup of the city was 95.89% White, 2.74% Native American, and 1.37% from two or more races.

There were 35 households, out of which 11.4% had children under the age of 18 living with them, 45.7% were married couples living together, 2.9% had a female householder with no husband present, and 40.0% were non-families. 31.4% of all households were made up of individuals, and 14.3% had someone living alone who was 65 years of age or older. The average household size was 2.09 and the average family size was 2.43.

In the city, the population was spread out, with 15.1% under the age of 18, 8.2% from 18 to 24, 23.3% from 25 to 44, 23.3% from 45 to 64, and 30.1% who were 65 years of age or older. The median age was 52 years. For every 100 females, there were 143.3 males. For every 100 females age 18 and over, there were 138.5 males.

The median income for a household in the city was $29,375, and the median income for a family was $33,750. Males had a median income of $30,417 versus $20,625 for females. The per capita income for the city was $20,600. There were 16.7% of families and 11.9% of the population living below the poverty line, including 50.0% of under eighteens and none of those over 64.

Education
Elsmore is a part of USD 256 Marmaton Valley Schools. The district high school is Marmaton Valley High School located in Moran. Marmaton Valley High School mascot is Wildcats.

Elsmore schools were closed through school unification. The Elsmore High School mascot was Elsmore Dragons.

References

Further reading

External links
 City of Elsmore
 Elsmore - Directory of Public Officials
 USD 256, local school district
 Elsmore city map, KDOT

Cities in Kansas
Cities in Allen County, Kansas
Populated places established in 1888
1888 establishments in Kansas